Gerard Armond Powell is an American entrepreneur born in Scranton, Pennsylvania on September 21, 1963. In 2015, Powell founded Rythmia Life Advancement Center in Costa Rica, after an experience with ayahuasca helped him overcome depression. The medically licensed luxury retreat center focuses on spiritual awakening and facilitates ayahuasca journeys (called "plant medicine" at the center).

Powell also founded Y-Rent, which was designed to help consumers buy homes with no down payment and low monthly payments. In 1994, he co-founded Cooperative Images Inc., which became ThatLook.com. The company went public in 1999. He later founded My Choice Medical, which was sold in 2004 for $94 million. He also founded Truthenomics, an online program that teaches manifestation skills.
He is the author of “Sh*t the Moon Said: A Story of Sex, Drugs and Ayahuasca” (2018, Health Communications)

References

1963 births
Living people
Businesspeople from Scranton, Pennsylvania